San Claudio (San Cloyo in Asturian) is a town situated in the municipality of Oviedo, Spain.  It lies three kilometers and a half from Oviedo.  It is named after Saint Claudius, a martyr of León, Spain.

The town center is called San Roque. Every summer San Claudio hosts its annual outdoor festival.

Parishes in Oviedo